Sandra Kay Duncan (born February 20, 1946) is an American actress, comedian, dancer and singer. She is known for her performances in the Broadway revival of Peter Pan and in the sitcom The Hogan Family. Duncan has been nominated for three Tony Awards, two Emmy Awards and two Golden Globe Awards.

Early life
Duncan was born on February 20, 1946, in New London, Texas, to Sylvia and Mancil Ray Duncan, a gas-station owner. She spent her early years there before moving to Tyler, Texas, when she was in third grade. She performed in her first dance recital at the age of five.

Career

Duncan started her entertainment career at age 12, working in a local production of The King and I for $150 a week. In the late 1960s, she appeared in a commercial for United California Bank and in the soap opera Search for Tomorrow for a brief period in 1968.

In 1970, Duncan was named one of the "most promising faces of tomorrow" by Time magazine. Also that year, she starred in the Broadway revival of The Boy Friend, for which she received favorable reviews. Duncan made her feature-film debut costarring with Dean Jones in the Walt Disney family comedy The Million Dollar Duck. She was then cast as Amy Cooper in the Paramount film version of Star Spangled Girl, based on the Broadway play by Neil Simon. Both films performed poorly at the box office. In autumn 1971, Duncan starred as Sandy Stockton on the CBS sitcom Funny Face. The program was placed in the Saturday-night prime-time schedule between All in the Family and The New Dick Van Dyke Show. Critics dismissed the show but praised Duncan, especially TV Guide columnist Cleveland Amory, who described her as "a wonderful comedienne."

Shortly after the premiere of Funny Face, Duncan underwent surgery to remove a benign brain tumor behind her left optic nerve. She lost vision in her left eye, but because it still tracked with her right eye, Duncan and her doctors elected to leave it in place. Her recovery from the operation was rapid, but CBS suspended production on Funny Face until the following year after the 12th installment had been filmed; the original series pilot served as the 13th (and final) episode. At first, Nielsen ratings for Funny Face were low, ranking in the lower 50s, but they eventually climbed to #17, and the show was called the best-liked new show of that television season. Duncan was nominated for an Emmy Award for Outstanding Continued Performance by an Actress in a Leading Role in a Comedy Series. In September 1972, Funny Face returned as The Sandy Duncan Show, with a revised format, new writers and a new time slot, Sundays at 8:30 p.m. Critical reaction to the show was similar to that for Funny Face, but without the strong Saturday night lead-in of All in the Family, the ratings sank. After 13 episodes, CBS canceled the series.

In 1976, Duncan played the title role in a television musical adaptation of Pinocchio that featured Danny Kaye as Geppetto and Flip Wilson as the Fox. She also guest-starred in a first-season episode of The Muppet Show. For her performance as Missy Anne Reynolds in the miniseries Roots, she earned another Emmy nomination.

Duncan then returned to the Broadway stage for many years. In 1979, her run as the title role in Peter Pan won her many accolades. She also had replacement roles in My One and Only and Chicago. She was nominated for a Tony Award three times: in 1969, for Featured Actress (Musical) for Canterbury Tales, in 1971, as Best Actress (Musical) for The Boy Friend and in 1980, as Best Actress (Musical) for Peter Pan.

In 1972, an animated version of Duncan (who contributed her own voice) appeared in the "Sandy Duncan's Jekyll and Hyde" episode of the CBS Saturday-morning cartoon The New Scooby-Doo Movies; forty-eight years later, she would reprise her guest star appearance in "The Dreaded Remake of Jekyll & Hyde!" episode of Scooby-Doo and Guess Who?. In 1976, she guest-starred on The Six Million Dollar Man and The Bionic Woman playing the role of Gillian in "The Return of Bigfoot" episodes.

In 1978, Duncan starred in Disney's The Cat from Outer Space along with Ken Berry, Harry Morgan and Roddy McDowall. From the mid-1970s through the 1980s, Duncan was the commercial spokesperson for Nabisco's Wheat Thins crackers.

In 1981, Duncan voiced Vixey in The Fox and the Hound. In 1984, she starred in a song and dance revue titled 5-6-7-8...Dance! at Radio City Music Hall and provided voice work for the My Little Pony television special Rescue at Midnight Castle as Firefly and Applejack. From 1986 to 1987, she reprised her role as Firefly in the My Little Pony 'n Friends series. In 1987, she joined the cast of NBC's Valerie's Family (previously known as Valerie, later to be retitled The Hogan Family) after Valerie Harper was dismissed. Duncan starred as the matriarch's sister-in-law Sandy Hogan, who moves in with her brother Mike (Josh Taylor) and his three sons to help raise the family after Valerie Hogan's death. Duncan remained with the series through its cancellation in 1991. In 1988, she worked on the first three Barney and the Backyard Gang children's videos. Duncan was asked to take part in the Barney & Friends television series, but declined the offer. In 1991, she voiced Peepers the mouse in the Don Bluth film Rock-a-Doodle. In 1994, she voiced Queen Uberta in the Richard Rich film The Swan Princess.

In 2003, Duncan appeared in the rotating cast of the Off-Broadway staged reading of Wit & Wisdom. In May 2008, she performed one of the lead roles in the musical No, No, Nanette, a production of the City Center's annual Encores! series. In April 2009, she performed the lead role in the play Driving Miss Daisy at Casa Mañana Theatre in Fort Worth, Texas. In September 2009, she played the lead role in Tennessee Williams' play The Glass Menagerie at the Mountain Playhouse in Jennerstown, Pennsylvania. She has also participated in many traveling stage productions, including The King and I.

On February 12, 2016, Duncan took the role of Madame du Maurier in the Broadway production of Finding Neverland. On February 17, the show's producers announced that she would take a temporary leave of absence because of family obligations.

Personal life

Duncan met singer-actor Bruce Scott (born Bruce Scott Zaharaides) during the Off-Broadway production of Your Own Thing, and they were married in September 1968. Their divorce, finalized in October 1972, was caused by tensions resulting from Duncan's success and rise to stardom. Duncan told People magazine in 1979 that "It was very threatening to Bruce."

Her second marriage was to Dr. Thomas Calcaterra on January 10, 1973; it lasted until 1979. Duncan met Calcaterra when he was a consulting surgeon for her brain-tumor surgery. This marriage also failed, according to Duncan, because of the demands of her 1978 nightclub act and her refusal to remain at home to be a good "doctor's wife."

Since July 21, 1980, Duncan has been married to actor choreographer Don Correia. They have two sons, born in 1982 and 1984. She and her husband, who performed together on stage before they wed, live in Connecticut. 

Taylorville, Illinois (near Springfield) named a street in her honor, Sandy Duncan Drive. Her character in Funny Face and The Sandy Duncan Show, Sandy Stockton, is from Taylorville.

Filmography

Film

Television

Theater

The King and I (1958)
Billion Dollar Baby (1961) 
South Pacific (1962) 
Show Boat (1963)
Apollo and Miss Agnes (1963)
My Fair Lady (1964)
The Sound of Music (1964)
Brigadoon (1965) 
The Music Man (1965)
Carousel (1966)
Peter Pan (1966) 
The Sound of Music (1967)
Finian's Rainbow (1967)
Life with Father (1967)
Wonderful Town (1967)
The Ceremony of Innocence (play) (1968)
Your Own Thing (1968)
Canterbury Tales (1969)
Love Is a Time of Day (1969)
The Boy Friend (1970)
Vanities (1976) 
Peter Pan (1979–1981)
5-6-7-8... Dance! (1984) 
My One and Only (1985–1986)
Waitin' in the Wings (1986)
Chicago (1996–1997) 
Jubilee (1998) 
Two for the Show (1999)
The Witches of Eastwick (1999) (reading)
Anything Goes (2002) 
The Fourth Wall (2002)
The Grass Harp (2003)
The King and I (2004) 
Mame (2006) 
Mud Donahue's Eccentric Son (2007) 
No, No, Nanette (2008)
Driving Miss Daisy (2009)
The Glass Menagerie (2009)
Driving Miss Daisy (2014)
Finding Neverland (2016)
Love Letters (2018)

Awards and nominations

References

External links

 
 
 
 
Interview with Sandy Duncan – Tyler Morning Telegraph, September, 2016.

1946 births
20th-century American actresses
20th-century American comedians
21st-century American actresses
21st-century American comedians
Actresses from Texas
American child actresses
American film actresses
American musical theatre actresses
American soap opera actresses
American stage actresses
American voice actresses
American women comedians
American women singers
Decca Records artists
Hollywood Records artists
Living people
Lon Morris College alumni
People from Henderson, Texas
People from Tyler, Texas
Singers from Texas
Traditional pop music singers
Torch singers